Greatest Hits (2009) is a re-issue of Mötley Crüe's 1998 compilation of the same name. The album contains a remix version of "The Animal in Me". Its first pressing is packaged with a second disc entitled Crüe Fest 2: Behind the Scenes. The reissue excludes the songs, "Enslaved", the remix of "Glitter", and "Bitter Pill". The jewel case packaging is a red version of the original's cover.

Overview
The track listing is composed of the band's most successful songs, featuring only the original line-up of Tommy Lee, Mick Mars, Vince Neil, and Nikki Sixx; songs from the albums Mötley Crüe and New Tattoo are not included, due to the absences of Neil and Lee. It is also the last album released by the band before their hiatus from 2015 to 2018.

Greatest Hits charted at No. 10 on the Top Hard Rock Albums chart and No. 9 on the Top Independent Albums chart in Billboard magazine.

Track listing

Chart positions

Certifications

References

External links

Mötley Crüe compilation albums
2009 greatest hits albums